The Llanwenog is a breed of domestic sheep originating in Wales. It was developed in the 19th century from the (now extinct) Llanllwni, the Shropshire, Welsh Mountain, and Clun Forest breeds. The Llanwenog's native locale is the Teifi Valley, in western Wales, but it has since spread into other areas. The breed association was formed in 1957. Llanwenogs have black faces and medium-length wool. They have a docile temperament and are known for their profligacy in lambing. The breed has a very placid temperament, is easily handled, easily contained and is well suited to stress free inwintering if necessary. This has important consequences for the health of both the animal and its keeper.  This breed is raised primarily for meat.

Characteristics
The Llanwenog is a medium-sized breed. Rams can reach  or more and ewes average . The face and legs are black with a tuft of wool on the forehead.

The sheep are long-lived, docile and easy to handle with easy lambing and good mothering abilities. They are economic to feed and can be housed in winter. Ewes can be crossed with other breeds if larger carcases are required.

Status
The number of purebred Llanwenogs has been decreasing over the last few years and there were estimated to be fewer than three thousand registered breeding ewes in 2015. The breed appears regularly at agricultural shows in Wales and England.

Notes

References

External links
 Llanwenog Sheep Society - United Kingdom

Sheep breeds originating in Wales
Sheep breeds